Then & Now is a compilation album by British rock supergroup Asia, released on 14 August 1990 by Geffen Records. It consists of two parts titled as Then and Now. Then comprises songs from the band's first two albums, Asia and Alpha, which featured the band's original line-up of Geoff Downes, Steve Howe, Carl Palmer, and John Wetton. Now comprises songs recorded by the band after Howe's departure (including "Voice of America" from the band's third album, Astra).

Reception

Then & Now has received negative reception from music critics. Greg Sandow in his review for Entertainment Weekly gave the album a rating of C. He wrote that the old hits such as "Heat of the Moment" and "Don't Cry" "are empty symphonic rock, full of strings and predictable melodic hooks", while the new songs "aren’t as lush", "hit the beat a little harder, but in essence [they’re] just as bland". Tom Demalon has given the compilation a retrospective rating of one-and-a-half stars out of five on AllMusic. He has noted that Asia were not able to repeat their early success with the new material, which has been described as "flaccid musically and insipid lyrically". "Days Like These", written by Steve Jones (the past leader for The Unforgiven), has been singled out as an exception, "which nearly matches the band's strong debut material".

The album only peaked at number 114 on the Billboard 200 and did not reach UK Albums Chart at all. However, it sold steadily over years and was certified gold on 23 July 1998 for over half a million copies shipped in the United States, where remains the group's third best selling album, trailing Asia and Alpha. To promote Then & Now, "Days Like These" was released as a single. The song gained substantial airplay during the summer of 1990 and was a number two hit on the Mainstream Rock chart. Despite this, the single stumbled at number 64 on the Billboard Hot 100 and has been the last to date chart entry for Asia in the United States.

Track listing

Personnel

Asia
 Geoff Downes – keyboards; producer (tracks 9, 10)
 John Wetton – lead vocals, backing vocals, bass; producer (tracks 7, 9)
 Steve Howe – guitar (tracks 1–5)
 Mandy Meyer – guitar (tracks 8, 10)
 Carl Palmer – drums, percussion

Guest musicians
 Steve Lukather – guitar (track 6)
 Ron Komie – guitar (track 7)
 Scott Gorham – guitar (track 9)
 Michael Sturgis - drums (track 9)

Technical personnel
 Mike Stone – producer (tracks 1–5, 8, 10), engineer (tracks 1–5, 8), mixing engineer (tracks 9, 10)
 Paul Northfield – engineer (tracks 4, 5)
 Frank Wolf – producer and engineer (track 6), mixing engineer (track 7), additional engineer (track 9)
 Sue Shifrin – producer (track 7)
 David Cassidy – producer (track 7)
 Guy Roche – producer (track 7)
 Greg Ladanyi – mixing engineer (track 10)
 Alan Douglas – mixing engineer (track 10)
 Dan Hersch – mastering engineer (at DigiPrep, Los Angeles)
 Gabrielle Raumberger – art direction
 Janet Wolsborn – design
 Caroline Greyshock – photography
 Jean-Francois Podevin – illustration
 Roger Dean – images from previous albums

Charts

Certifications

References

Asia (band) albums
1990 compilation albums
Geffen Records compilation albums